Red Sea Cable is the designation of a 13.6 km long 400 kV AC submarine power cable under the Red Sea in
order to interconnect the power grids of Egypt and Jordan. The project was commissioned in 1994 and inaugurated
in 1998.
The cable with a maximum transmission capacity of 2000 MW reaches a maximum depth of 850 metres. It has a cross section
of 1000 mm2 per conductor and is implemented as oil-filled single core cable insulated with cellulose paper impregnated with a low viscosity mineral oil.
A sheath of arsenic lead alloy F3 (0.15% arsenic, 0.1% tin, 0.1% bismuth and 99.65% lead) prevents water from penetrating the paper insulation.
The cable is part of a 400 kV-line from Taba in Egypt to Aqaba in Jordan.

Coordinates 
 29.379469 N 34.977669 E: Aqaba Power Station
 29.432459 N 34.977121 E: Aqaba Cable Terminal
 29.486346 N 34.875476 E: Taba Cable Terminal
 29.611148 N 34.841852 E: Taba substation

See also

 Energy in Egypt

References

Submarine power cables
Red Sea
Electric power in Egypt
Electric power in Jordan
Energy infrastructure completed in 1998
1998 establishments in Egypt
1998 establishments in Jordan